Dixanthogen disulfides are a class of organosulfur compounds with the formula .  Usually yellow solids, they are the product of the oxidation of xanthate salts.    A common derivative is diethyl dixanthogen disulfide. Diisopropyl dixanthogen disulfide is commercially available. They are structurally related to thiuram disulfides.

Uses and reactions
Diethyl dixanthogen disulfide is a component for froth flotations used, inter alia, for the separation of sulfide minerals like pyrrhotite. Diisopropyl dixanthogen disulfide is a reagent in the synthesis of sulfur heterocycles.

Dialkoxy dixanthogen disulfides undergo desulfurization by cyanide to give bis(alkoxythiocarbonyl)sulfides:

Dixanthogens are also ectoparasiticides.

References

Thiocarbonyl compounds
Organic disulfides
Sulfur
Functional groups
Dermatologic drugs